Kurumba (Tribe) (Tamil: Kurumban, Kurumbar) (Malayalam: Kuruman) (Kannada: Kuruba, Kurubaru), a fierce race is the most important of all those tribes, owing to the influential part they have played in the History of India. They were representatives of ancient Kurumba or Pallavas who were once so powerful throughout Southern India. Kurumba sovereignty was affected by the Chola King Adondai about 7th or 8th century AD and they were scattered far and wide.

Kurumba are shepherds and weavers of coarse woolen blankets.

Kurumba are a designated Scheduled Tribe in the Indian states of Karnataka, Kerala and Tamil Nadu. The Kurumbar are one of the earliest known inhabitants of the Western Ghats, who are engaged in the collection and gathering of forest produce, mainly wild honey and wax. The members of this community are short, have dark skin, and have protruding foreheads.

Kurumbar believe in Hinduism. The main deity of the tribe is Lord Shiva under the name of Bhairava. They also worship animals, birds, trees, rock hillocks, and snakes, along with the other Hindu deities.

There are several divisions of Kurumba: Jenu, Betta and Alu. Each of these divisions speaks their own Dravidian language. Jenu Kurubas are primarily found in the northern part of the Nilgiris, in the Mysuru district of Karnataka.

Kurumbar are one of the six ancient tribal groups in Tamil Nadu. According to the Madras Census Report of 1891, the Pallavas were Kurumbas. They live very much in tune with Nature. Hunting and collecting forest produce are the two main means of living for the Kurumbar tribe. However, the restrictions to protect native forest and wildlife have forced them to find work outside the forests.

References 
5. https://en.m.wikipedia.org/wiki/Gadaria
Ethnic groups in India
Scheduled Tribes of India
Indigenous peoples of South Asia